The Richmond Downtown Historic District is an area of primarily commercial buildings and national historic district located at Richmond, Wayne County, Indiana.  The district encompasses 47 contributing buildings located along the National Road.   It developed between about 1868 and 1960 and includes representative examples of Italianate, Romanesque Revival, Queen Anne, Classical Revival, and Chicago School style architecture.  Located in the district is the separately listed Murray Theater.  Other notable buildings include the I.O.O.F. Building (1868), Hittle Building (1878), Tivoli Theater (1926), Romey's Building (1920), George H. Knollenberg Building (1877), Kresge Building (c. 1930), Dickinson Building (1880), former U.S. Post Office (1905), and YMCA (1908).

The district was added to the National Register of Historic Places in 2011.

See also 
 Starr Historic District
 Richmond Railroad Station Historic District
 Reeveston Place Historic District
 East Main Street-Glen Miller Park Historic District
 Old Richmond Historic District
 Richmond, Indiana explosion

References

Historic districts on the National Register of Historic Places in Indiana
Italianate architecture in Indiana
Queen Anne architecture in Indiana
Romanesque Revival architecture in Indiana
Neoclassical architecture in Indiana
Historic districts in Richmond, Indiana
National Register of Historic Places in Wayne County, Indiana